The University of Tulsa College of Law is the law school of the private University of Tulsa in Tulsa, Oklahoma. For 2021, U.S. News & World Report ranked the University of Tulsa College of Law at No. 111 among all law schools in the United States. It is the only law school in the Tulsa Metropolitan Area and northeastern Oklahoma.

History 
The University of Tulsa College of Law was founded by local attorneys in 1923, during one of Tulsa's oil booms.  The law school was originally known simply as the Tulsa Law School and was independent of the University of Tulsa. Initially, classes took place in the Central High School building in downtown Tulsa, while the law library was in the Tulsa County courthouse, a few blocks away. The faculty initially consisted of practicing Tulsa attorneys who taught classes at night.

Tulsa Law was formally absorbed by the University of Tulsa in 1943. A pioneering Tulsa attorney named John Rogers is credited with making this association. In 1949, the school moved into a downtown office building. In 1953, the school was accredited by the American Bar Association. During the 1950s and 60s, the library, classrooms and administrative offices were consolidated at a single location in downtown Tulsa and full-time tenured and tenure-track research faculty were hired. The school became a member of the Association of American Law Schools in 1966. The name of the school was formally changed to the University of Tulsa College of Law.

In the late 1970s, Tulsa Law became increasingly prominent in the field of energy law and policy; during this period, the Energy Law Journal and the National Energy and Law Policy Institute were established at the law school (NELPI). The National Energy Law and Policy Institute was initially led by Kent Frizzell, who had served as Assistant Attorney General of the United States from 1972 to 1973 and Undersecretary of the Department of the Interior from 1975 to 1977. During this time, Frizzell also taught at Tulsa Law.

In the 1990s, Tulsa Law developed a reputation for strength in legal history, hiring legal historian Bernard Schwartz (formerly of New York University Law School) and, later, Paul Finkelman.

Law School Building
Tulsa Law moved from downtown Tulsa to its present location on the University of Tulsa's main campus in 1973, where it was housed in what was then named John Rogers Hall. The building was formally dedicated with a speech by U.S. Supreme Court Justice William Rehnquist.

In May 2016, the university decided to remove the name of John Rogers from the law school's building, in response to increased controversy about Rogers' role in the founding of the Ku Klux Klan in Tulsa in the 1920s.

Academic Programs and Offerings 
TU College of Law offers Juris Doctor programs for full-time and part-time students.  TU Law also grants the degree of Master of Laws, or LLM, in the areas of Native American Law, Natural Resources and Energy Law, and International Law for foreign students.  Additionally, the College of Law offers two online Master of Jurisprudence (MJ) degrees in Indian law and energy law. Students  have the ability to obtain joint JD/MA degrees in a variety of fields including, history, English, psychology, as well as a joint JD/MBA, joint JD/Masters in Taxation]], and joint JD/MS in geosciences, biological sciences, and finance.  TU Law offers certificate programs in sustainable energy and resources law, Native American law, and health law.

The college also hosts a number of endowed lecture series which bring renowned scholars and jurists to campus:
 The John W. Hager Distinguished Lecture in Law has brought Lawrence Lessig, William Eskridge, Michelle Alexander and Harold Koh to speak at the College of Law in recent years.  
 The Buck Colbert Franklin Memorial Civil Rights Lecture honors the pioneering attorney and early leader of Tulsa's black community (who was also the father of famed historian John Hope Franklin. This lecture series has brought Deborah Rhode, Jerry Kang and Alfred Brophy to speak at TU Law.
 The Stephanie K. Seymour Distinguished Lecture in Law is the only lecture series in the country established by former clerks to honor the judge for whom they served. This lecture calls attention to the scholarship of an untenured law professor whose dedication and passion mirror that of Judge Seymour.

The College of Law also has study abroad arrangements allowing students to study in Dublin or London.

The University of Tulsa College of Law is a national leader in teaching scholarship and research in energy, environmental, and natural resources law and policy and Native American law.

Student-Edited Publications
Tulsa Law Review, previously the Tulsa Law Journal from 1964 to 2001
Energy Law Journal

Clinical Offerings 

The on-campus Boesche Legal Clinic offers students real-world experience under the supervision of clinical professors while providing pro bono legal services to disadvantaged populations.  Clinics include the Immigrant Rights Project and the Lobeck Taylor Family Advocacy Clinic.  Previous projects have centered on among the aged, American Indians, inter alia.

In 2016, Tulsa Law launched the Solo Practice Clinic to help its students develop the skills necessary to operate their own legal practices, which is particularly common for attorneys serving rural, small business and low-income clients, among others.

Employment

According to TU Law's 2021 ABA-required disclosures, 91.6% of the Class of 2016 obtained full-time, long-term positions for which bar passage was required (75%) or for which a J.D. was an advantage (16.6%) nine months after graduation, excluding solo practitioners and clerkships, putting TU in the middle of regional peers like Baylor Law School, the University of Oklahoma College of Law, and SMU Dedman School of Law. The most popular destinations for TU Law graduates are Oklahoma and Texas.

Costs

The total cost of attendance (indicating the cost of tuition, fees, and living expenses) at TU Law for the 2015–2016 academic year is $58,496 (full-time). 100% of TU Law students received scholarships and/or tuition benefits in 2015.

The Law School Transparency estimated debt-financed cost of attendance for three years is $201,183 (however this figure does not account for merit- or need-based aid).

Notable faculty
The notable current and former faculty of TU Law include:

 Larry Catá Backer – Cuban-American scholar of comparative law and international affairs
 Robert Butkin – Law professor, former Dean of Tulsa Law, and former State Treasurer of Oklahoma
 Brad Carson - former U.S. Representative from Oklahoma and Under Secretary of the Army
 Nancy Feldman – Civil rights activist and community leader
 Paul Finkelman – Legal historian (Finkelman was listed as one of the ten most-cited legal historians in Brian Leiter's survey of most-cited law professors by specialty from 2000 to 2007)
 Kent Frizzell – United States Under Secretary of the Interior (1975–1977) and Attorney General of Kansas (1969–1971) 
 F. Russell Hittinger – Legal philosopher and Catholic theologian, member of the Pontifical Academy of Social Sciences
 Sven Erik Holmes – General Counsel of KPMG, former Federal District Judge for Northern District of Oklahoma. 
 Janet K. Levit - joined law faculty as professor in 1995. She was promoted to dean of TU College of Law in 2017, then became Provost and vice president of TU. Served as Interim President of TU, July 2020 - January 2022, then returned to her previous duties.
 John S. Lowe – Energy law scholar
 Joseph Wilson Morris – Federal District Judge for the Eastern District of Oklahoma, former General Counsel for Shell Oil Company
 Marian P. Opala, Oklahoma Supreme Court Justice
 Frank Pommersheim – scholar of Native American Law; serves as the Chief Justice for the Cheyenne River Sioux Tribal Court of Appeals 
 Melissa L. Tatum – Scholar of Native American law

Notable alumni

Notes

References

External links

Law schools in Oklahoma
Law
Educational institutions established in 1923
1923 establishments in Oklahoma